"My Tribute (To God Be the Glory)" is a gospel song written by American gospel singer and songwriter Andraé Crouch. He first recorded it in 1972 on his album Keep on Singin'. It is considered one of Crouch's most well-known songs. It is sometimes included in Christian children's song books.

References

External links 

Andraé Crouch - My Tribute (To God Be the Glory)
Sissel - My Tribute (To God Be the Glory)

Gospel songs
1972 songs
Songs written by Andraé Crouch